Polar Golfer is a Windows based video game released by WildTangent in 2004. The game is played on an 18-hole virtual golf course, with various characters. It is sometimes bundled with Dell computers, along with other software.

References

WildTangent games
Golf video games
2004 video games
Video games developed in the United States
Windows games
Windows-only games